Paramjeet Samota (born 5 July 1988) is an Indian amateur boxer best known for winning a Commonwealth Games Gold Medal in 2010 at Super Heavyweight.

Early life
Samota grew up in Dinod
, a village near Bhiwani.

Career
Samota won a gold medal in the Super heavyweight category at the 2010 Commonwealth Games, defeating Tariq Abdul Haqq of Trinidad & Tobago 5-1. In the fifth Commonwealth Boxing Championships held in New Delhi from 10–18 March 2010, he, along with five other fellow Indians, won a gold medal, defeating New Zealand's Joseph Parker 7-3. He won a bronze medal in the Men's Super heavyweight category at the 2010 Asian Games, as he lost in the semifinals to eventual winner Zhang Zhilei.

References

Indian male boxers
Living people
Boxers from Haryana
People from Bhiwani district
1988 births
Asian Games medalists in boxing
Boxers at the 2010 Asian Games
Medalists at the 2010 Asian Games
Asian Games bronze medalists for India
Commonwealth Games gold medallists for India
Commonwealth Games medallists in boxing
Boxers at the 2010 Commonwealth Games
Super-heavyweight boxers
Medallists at the 2010 Commonwealth Games